Orinoma damaris, the tigerbrown, is a species of satyrine butterfly found in Asia.

Subspecies
Orinoma damaris damaris
Orinoma damaris harmostus Fruhstorfer, 1911

References

Elymniini
Butterflies of Indochina
Taxa named by George Robert Gray
Butterflies described in 1846